The 1974 ABA Playoffs was the postseason tournament of the American Basketball Association's 1973-1974 season. The tournament concluded with the Eastern Division champion New York Nets defeating the Western Division champion Utah Stars, four games to one in the ABA Finals.

Notable events

A one-game playoff was held to determine the fourth-place finisher in the Western Division because the San Diego Conquistadors and Denver Rockets had both tied for fourth place during the regular season.  The game was played on March 29, 1974, with the Conquistadors posting a 131–111 win at Denver.

The Carolina Cougars played their final game on April 8, 1974, losing at home to the Kentucky Colonels 128–119 in the last game of their Eastern Division semifinal series, which the Colonels swept 4 games to none.  The Cougars played in the remaining two seasons of the ABA as the Spirits of St. Louis and were one of only two teams (the Colonels being the other) remaining during the ABA-NBA merger to not enter the NBA.

The New York Nets and Utah Stars won the Eastern Division and Western Division, respectively, in both the regular season and the playoffs.

The New York Nets became the first team since the 1969-1970 Indiana Pacers to win the ABA championship after posting the league's best regular season record.

Julius Erving of the New York Nets was the Most Valuable Player of the ABA playoffs.  He won that distinction again in 1976 and became the only player in ABA history to repeat as the MVP of the league playoffs.

Western Division

Champion:  Utah Stars

Division Semifinals

(1) Utah Stars vs. (4) San Diego Conquistadors:
Stars win series 4-2
Game 1 @ Utah:  Utah 114, San Diego 99
Game 2 @ Utah:  Utah 119, San Diego 105
Game 3 @ San Diego:  San Diego 97, Utah 96
Game 4 @ San Diego:  San Diego 100, Utah 98
Game 5 @ Utah:  Utah 110, San Diego 93
Game 6 @ San Diego:  Utah 110, San Diego 99

(2) Indiana Pacers vs. (3) San Antonio Spurs:
Pacers win series 4-3
Game 1 @ Indiana:  San Antonio 113, Indiana 109
Game 2 @ Indiana:  Indiana 128, San Antonio 101
Game 3 @ San Antonio:  San Antonio 115, Indiana 96
Game 4 @ San Antonio:  Indiana 91, San Antonio 89
Game 5 @ Indiana:  Indiana 105, San Antonio 100
Game 6 @ San Antonio:  San Antonio 102, Indiana 86
Game 7 @ Indiana:  Indiana 86, San Antonio 79

Division Finals

(1) Utah Stars vs. (2) Indiana Pacers:
Stars win series 4-3
Game 1 @ Utah:  Utah 105, Indiana 96
Game 2 @ Utah:  Utah 106, Indiana 102
Game 3 @ Indiana:  Utah 99, Indiana 90
Game 4 @ Indiana:  Indiana 118, Utah 107
Game 5 @ Utah:  Indiana 110, Utah 101
Game 6 @ Indiana:  Indiana 91, Utah 89
Game 7 @ Utah:  Utah 109, Indiana 87

Eastern Division

Champion:  New York Nets

Division Semifinals

(1) New York Nets vs. (4) Virginia Squires:
Nets win series 4-1
Game 1 @ New York:  New York 108, Virginia 96
Game 2 @ New York:  New York 129, Virginia 110
Game 3 @ Virginia:  Virginia 116, New York 115
Game 4 @ Virginia:  New York 116, Virginia 88
Game 5 @ New York:  New York 108, Virginia 96

(2) Kentucky Colonels vs. (3) Carolina Cougars:
Colonels win series 4-0
Game 1 @ Kentucky:  Kentucky 118, Carolina 102
Game 2 @ Kentucky:  Kentucky 99, Carolina 96
Game 3 @ Carolina:  Kentucky 120, Carolina 110
Game 4 @ Carolina:  Kentucky 128, Carolina 119

Division Finals

(1) New York Nets vs. (2) Kentucky Colonels:
Nets win series 4-0
Game 1 @ New York:  New York 119, Kentucky 106
Game 2 @ New York:  New York 99, Kentucky 80
Game 3 @ Kentucky:  New York 89, Kentucky 87
Game 4 @ Kentucky:  New York 103, Kentucky 90

ABA Finals

(1) New York Nets VS. (1) Utah Stars:
Nets win series 4-1
Game 1 (Apr 30) @ New York:  New York 89, Utah 85
Game 2 (May  4) @ New York:  New York 118, Utah 94
Game 3 (May  6) @ Utah:  New York 103, Utah 100
Game 4 (May  8) @ Utah:  Utah 97, New York 89
Game 5 (May 10) @ New York:  New York 111, Utah 100

References

External links
RememberTheABA.com page on 1974 ABA playoffs
Basketball-Reference.com's 1974 ABA Playoffs page

Playoffs
American Basketball Association playoffs